Saidabad Rural District is in the Central District of Shahriar County, Tehran province, Iran. At the National Census of 2006, its population was 16,176 in 4,190 households. There were 17,671 inhabitants in 4,822 households at the following census of 2011. At the most recent census of 2016, the population of the rural district was 18,903 in 5,446 households. The largest of its three villages was Saidabad, with 16,212 people.

References 

Shahriar County

Rural Districts of Tehran Province

Populated places in Tehran Province

Populated places in Shahriar County